Negreni is a commune in Cluj County, Transylvania, Romania. It is composed of three villages: Bucea (Királyhágó), Negreni and Prelucele (Prelak). These were part of Ciucea Commune from 1968 to 2002, when they were split off.

Negreni is located in the northwestern corner of the county, on the border with Bihor and Sălaj counties. Its neighbors are the following communes: Ciucea to the east, Bulz (Bihor) to the south, Bratca (Bihor) to the west, and Sâg (Sălaj) to the north.

National road DN1 (which runs from Bucharest to the border with Hungary) connects Negreni to the county seat, Cluj-Napoca,  to the east and to Oradea,  to the west. Furthermore, the Piatra Craiului train station in Bucea serves the CFR Line 300, on the segment from Huedin to Oradea.

At the 2011 census, 94.57% of inhabitants were Romanians and 2.33% Roma.

For centuries, a fair has been held in Negreni, on the banks of the Crișul Repede, during the first week of October; in 2020 and 2021, the fair was cancelled, due to COVID-19.

References

Atlasul localităților județului Cluj (Cluj County Localities Atlas), Suncart Publishing House, Cluj-Napoca,

External links

Communes in Cluj County
Localities in Transylvania